Cosa was a Latin colony founded in southwestern Tuscany in 273 BC,  on land confiscated from the Etruscans, to solidify the control of the Romans and offer the Republic a protected port.
The Etruscan site (called Cusi or Cosia) may have been where modern Orbetello stands; a fortification wall in polygonal masonry at Orbetello's lagoon may be in phase with the walls of Cosa.  The position of Cosa is distinct, rising some 113 metres above sea level and is sited 140 km northwest of Rome on the Tyrrhenian Sea coast, on a hill near the small town of Ansedonia.  The town experienced a hard life and was never truly a prosperous Roman city, although it has assumed a position of prominence in Roman archaeology owing to the circumstances of its excavation (cf. Dyson 2005, below).  After the foundation, wars of the 3rd century BC affected the town.  New colonists arrived in 197 BC. Cosa seems to have prospered until it was sacked in the 60s BC, perhaps by pirates - although an earthquake and unrest related to the Catilinarian Conspiracy have also been cited as reasons.  This led to a re-foundation under Augustus and then life continued until the 3rd century.  One of the last textual references to Cosa comes from the work of Rutilius Claudius Namatianus in his De reditu suo.  In the passage 1.285-90, Rutilius remarks that by AD 417 the site of Cosa was deserted and could be seen to be in ruins.  He further suggests that a plague of mice had driven the people of Cosa away.

Archaeology
In the 20th century, Cosa was the site of excavations carried out under the auspices of the American Academy in Rome, initially under the direction of the archaeologist Frank Edward Brown. Excavations (1948–54, 1965–72) have traced the city plan, the principal buildings, the port, and have uncovered the Arx, the forum, and a number of houses. Unexcavated buildings include a bathing establishment, but no trace of a theatre or an amphitheatre has been found.  In the 1990s a series of excavations was carried out under the direction of Elizabeth Fentress, then associated with the American Academy in Rome.  This latter campaign aimed at understanding the history of the site between the imperial period and the Middle Ages. Sample excavations took place over the whole site, with larger excavations on the Arx, the Eastern Height and around the Forum.
From 2005 to 2012 the Universities of Granada and Barcelona excavated a domus, while from 2013  Florida State University has excavated a bath building in the southwest corner of the Forum. From 2016, l’Università di Firenze has been excavating along the processional street P.

City walls and gates
The city wall of Cosa was built at the time of the foundation of the colony on 273 BCE. It is 1.5 kilometres (0.93 miles) long and built in polygonal masonry of Lugli's third type. It included a system of interval towers, numbering eighteen in all. These are found at irregular intervals, and all but one are rectangular in plan - the exception is round. There are three gates which correspond to as many roads: the northwest, or Florentine gate, which corresponds to the modern entrance to the site, the northeast, or Roman gate, and the southeast, or maritime gate. These each have the same structure, twin gate, one in line with the walls and one to the inside, with a space between them. The arx also had an independent circuit wall. At the western corner of this was a postern, closed in the early Byzantine period, when the hill was refortified with a wall built with an emplecton. A final, medieval, circuit in mortared rubble masonry runs along the same line.

In recent years the Archaeological Soprintendenza of Tuscany has conducted extensive documentation, repairs and reconstructions of the walls.

Urban layout
Within the city walls the urban area was divided into an orthogonal plan, with space allotted for civic, sacred, and private architecture. The plan represents a subtle adaptation of an orthogonal plan to the complicated topography of the hill. The forum was found on a saddle between two heights, with the sacred area, with the Capitolium, linked to it by a broad street.  Recent excavations have suggested that the original layout provided for about 248 houses, of which 20 were intended for the decurions, and were double the size of the houses of the ordinary citizens. The larger houses were found on the forum and the main processional streets.

Temples on the Arx

The vast majority of religious monuments at Cosa were located at the Arx, "an area sacra, abode of those gods, quorum maxime in tutela civitas."  The Arx was positioned at the highest and southernmost point of the colony. Its limits were defined by the Town Wall on the S and W sides, by cliffs on the NW side, and by the Arx Wall on the NE side.  In total, the Arx constituted around one-twentieth of the whole area of the townsite.  Aside from the colony's walls, the Arx provides us with the site's most impressive remains, the first American excavation taking place from 1948-1950.  Though mainly a religious center, there is some evidence of Republican housing. The Arx reached its fullest development in the early 2nd century BC, consisting of at least three temples and the Capitolium.
The arx or citadel of Cosa received some of the first serious treatment by Frank E. Brown and his team when they began the Cosa excavations in 1948.  The citadel was a fortified hill on which were built several temples, including the so-called capitolium of Cosa.
Brown also discovered a pit (mundus) that he thought was connected to the first rituals of foundation carried out at Cosa in 273 BC.  On the arx were two temples, one the triple-cella building dubbed the Capitolium of Cosa, the other a smaller temple.

Capitolium

The Capitolium at Cosa marks, as far as we know, the only capitolium constructed in a Latin colony.  It was located at the summit of the Arx and would have been visible for miles at sea. Smaller temples to the left and the right accompany the Capitolium, the entire complex accessible from the Forum by the Via Sacra. The Capitolium was oriented ENE and consisted of three cellae with a deep columnar pronaos (with the length of the space equally divided between the cellae and the pronaos). This was preceded by a terraced forecourt. Approaching from this forecourt, one would have faced continuous steps across the entire facade. The temple walls rose from a high podium, its steps oriented on the axis of the Via Sacra. It is believed that the Capitolium was modeled after the 6th-century BC Temple of Jupiter, Juno, and Minerva at Rome. Its moldings are similar to the building traditions of Etruscan and early Roman architecture.  The Capitolium was built in the 2nd century BC, most likely as an affirmation of Roman loyalty and identity following the Second Punic War. A square platform is located underneath the Capitolium, cut into the rock but oriented differently than the later building. A crevasse/pit with vegetative remains is located here, suggesting some sort of ritual activity with associated with the religious foundation of Cosa. The exact meaning behind this find is undetermined, the source of much controversy and skepticism.

Unidentified temple
The remains of an unidentified temple lie on the crest of the Arx by the south wall of the Capitolium.  For the most part, the remains have not been excavated; the original building was obliterated in antiquity after destruction by fire.  The temple was not rebuilt, leaving only Temple D and the Capitolium at that time (middle of the 1st century BC). Though the burning itself does not imply a battle, the subsequent construction of fortifications may suggest some sort of attack.  Scholars have only been able to identify this building through traces of walls and fragments of its terracotta decoration. These remains included two subtypes of antefix, one featuring a bust of Minerva and the other Hercules. The temple has thus been attributed to Jupiter, both Minerva and Hercules being offspring of the god.  Much speculation arises, however, as the gods held a wide variety of contexts in Italy.  Furthermore, when the site was further explored in the 1960s, no more traces of the temple were found.

Temple D
Dating to the late 3rd century BC, Temple D was located opposite the north angle of the Capitolium's forecourt and was oriented SE.  It supported a single square cella. Temple D has been identified as being dedicated to the Roman-Italic goddess Mater Matuta, though this conclusion remains speculative.

Architectural remains
A great deal of important terracotta fragments have been found at Cosa and the Arx. They suggest various phases of temple decoration and redecoration and include (among others) pedimental structures and revetment plaques. Most of the remains date from the late 3rd century to the early 1st century BC. They display similar qualities as finds from Latin and Etruscan sites in Hellenistic Italy. Dyson holds that these evolving styles and similarities reflected the influence of the larger Hellenistic Mediterranean world that Rome was beginning to dominate. Two sets of these remains clearly belong to the earliest buildings (the Capitolium and Temple D), however, there is a third unidentified set. Scholars have used this set to explain the hypothetical Temple of Jupiter discussed earlier.

Temple A
Temple A consisted of a terraced podium and was oriented southwest. It was roughly the same size as the Capitolium with its forecourt, measuring 43 x 28 meters. The polygonal masonry of its podium closely related to that of the town walls.

Forum

The forum was the public square of the city and was the site of many important structures, included a basilica and a curia-comitium complex, as well as buildings Brown termed atria publica, which have now been shown to be houses.  The forum of Cosa is fairly complex in archaeological terms and many of the Republican structures were later built over with constructions of the Imperial period.
Important buildings in the forum area included: Temple B, a possible mall, a Comitium, a Curia, a Basilica, and included one of Italy's oldest monumental arches that allowed entrance into the forum.

History
The Forum of Cosa occupied one-tenth of the town-site. The first signs of activity in the Forum were of digging and opening of cisterns and pits. The four cisterns situated in the Forum held approximately 988,000 liters of water, which added to the Reservoir at the western corner of the Forum of 750,000 liters. The Reservoir was used as a public reserve and dated from before the arrival of the colony. The new cisterns were created as a response to the demand of the Forum, which was used as both a daily marketplace as well as a common gathering ground. A large enclosure, for the purpose of assembly, was constructed at a date before the First Punic War. It had an amphitheatric arrangement that had steps which were too little for seating and a floor too small for a gladiatorial arena. This was the Comitium of Cosa.

There was a break in the creation of public works due to two decades of war and again another interruption in 225 BC by Gallic raids. The remains of a quadrilateral platform floored with tegulae, a form of tiling, were discovered southeast of the Comitium. It is suggested that this building had served as a rain catchment and the water collected here would have been impounded into a cistern. After the war had ended in 201 BC, new colonists arrived and set off a flood of activity. Eight very similar and unitary buildings were built around the Forum in the 170s, but were destroyed in the sack of Cosa a century later. These eight were known by Brown as the 'Atrium Buildings' although they have now been shown to have been houses. Once the square had been reconstructed, the Curia was rebuilt into its second form. However, this form only lasted for fifteen to twenty years before new spaces were required. Curia II was demolished in order to build Curia III, but little remains of the original structure.

The next building created for the Forum was Temple B, which is dated from 175-150 BC. About thirty to forty years later, the temple was seriously damaged by a collapse of a wall, which led to its reconstruction. The new Temple B was designed to preserve the older sacred structure while rebuilding the sanctuary in a new form. After the rebuilding of Curia III and Temple B, the Basilica was laid out.

The city was sacked in 70 BC and much of the colony was restored unevenly. Atrium Buildings Seven and Eight were not rebuilt, while buildings one through five were. Although the Basilica had survived the sack, it had been rotting and eventually a central wall collapsed outward. In the '50s AD the site was hit by a substantial earthquake, and Atrium Building V, the 'House of Diana' was occupied by the man in charge of rebuilding, L. Titinius Glaucus.  At this point the basilica was reconstructed as an odeum. However, the house, and the other buildings around the forum, were abandoned soon afterwards.  A revival of activity occurred under Caracalla, when two substantial horrea were built, and the portico around the forum rebuilt, with a sanctuary to Liber Pater on the northeast side. Occupation ceased by the middle of the century, except for occasional visits to the sanctuary.

Curia and Comitium
There are many important aspects to Cosa, especially the Forum; however, two of the most important structures are the Curia and Comitium. The Comitium at Cosa is a fairly new discovery and shows many similarities to Rome. The Curia lies on the northern end of the Comitium. The oldest part of the Curia dates back to the start of Cosa around 273B BC. The Curia, originally thought to be a temple, was found on the Northeast corner in between a basilica and Temple B. The building was identified when the area in front was excavated and found to be "a circle of dark earth enclosed by a sandy yellow fill".  The Curia was originally thought to be a temple this is because the concept for the shape of the Comitium with the Curia mirrors the look of a stairway up to a temple. This idea can be seen from archaeological evidence such as the Theater of Pompey with the Temple Venus Victrix. Permanent theaters were not a norm and were considered a place of gathering of the people against the senate around 55 BC when Pompey built his theater. However, to make sure he could build it, he replicated the concept of the Comitium and the Curia by placing a temple to Venus at the top of the theater with steps that doubled as seating.

The original Curia built shows many connections to the Curia Hostilia at Rome. It is thought to have been a wooden structure with a stone base that was later made more permanent. The Comitium steps, which lead up to the Curia, appear to have been stone from the beginning. There are several layers of Curia with the original starting as a small two story building. This consisted of the curia proper and possibly a records office. The biggest change is seen around 173 BC in what is considered the coming of the second wave of colonist, which called for a larger Curia. The Curia was then expanded into a larger building with three halls. Scholars speculate that these three halls are at the northern end a tabularium, with offices for aediles and other magistrates on the south side, and the Curia in the middle. This occurrence of being tripartite is seen as a common aspect of Roman culture as well as in other areas of archaeology such as the later with the Curia Julia and around the 4th/3rd century BC with the south halls of the Forum at Pompeii.

The Comitium, a circular-like mini amphitheater, was most likely stairs to the Curia. For Rome, it is seen that the ‘seats’ of the Comitium were also used as the stairs to get to the Curia so we can deduce, from the similarities of Rome and Cosa, that this was most likely the case for Cosa as well. The Curia is used for the proper assemblies of the magistrates, while the Comitium was most likely used for public events, assemblies, funerals, and speeches. The Comitium seats would most likely have been stood on first to allow for more people to assemble and second because the size and shape (about 33 cm x 40 cm wide) would not have allowed for comfortable seating. Approximately 600 people could stand on the Comitium steps with others around the Comitium looking at some type of Rostra where the speaker would be.

Temples B and C
Separate from the Arx, Temples B and C stood side by side to the southeast of the basilica. Little of Temple C, the smaller of the two, remains visible. Temple B consisted of an extended terraced forecourt and at least one stone-vaulted cistern. Temple B presents several important considerations, beginning with the fact that its remains show no significant program of architectural redesign. The building also showed that terracottas could remain in one place for a long time or be replaced by units made in the original molds. Finally, deposits of the different cresting subtypes showed that two pediments could carry different decorative schemes permanently and concurrently.

The Eastern Height

Temple E

This small building is constructed at the summit of the Eastern Height, on an artificially flattened errace facing the sea.  The subsequent use of this site for a number of early medieval buildings has left little legible, but there remains enough to know that the podium, built of large ashlars like those of Temple D70 BCE, measured 6.25 x 11.25m.  A date in the Republican period, perhaps in the middle of the second century BCE, has been proposed on the basis of a fragment of a greco-italic amphora of that date found inside the podium. This aligns with the comparison of its architectural terracottas with those of the original decoration of the Capitolium and those of Temple B.  The temple may only have survived until 70 BCE, as the Augustan reconstruction does not seem to have reached that part of the original town.

Private houses
The site has played an important role in the interpretation of Roman colonization during the Middle Republican period. The housing has been the subject of two extensive publications. .

The House of Diana
On the forum, the House of Diana on the south side of the forum was excavated and restored between 1995 and 1999. It was published in full by E. Fentress (2004), and a detailed report on the stratigraphy is available on the web (http://www.press.umich.edu/webhome/cosa/home.html)  This is a large house, 16m wide, on a standard atrium plan, very similar to that of the House of Sallust in Pompeii. Built around 170 BCE, it reveals the standard plan of a Roman atrium house.  In front, opening onto the forum, are two tabernae, with rear rooms and cesspits, probably intended for the sale of wine, in one case, and food, in the other.  Between them the atrium was entered through a fauces.  It was compluviate, with a central impluvium.  On the right and left were two cubicula, followed by two alae, or side rooms.  At the back were found the kitchen, the tablinum, or reception room and the triclinium, or dining room.  Beyond them lay a garden, probably used for raising vegetables, as a large compost heap suggests.  The house was destroyed around 70 BCE, and was entirely rebuilt in the Augustan period, from which we have a fine series of frescoes and mosaics. At this point the triclinium was opened towards the rear, connected to the garden, now ornamental, through a colonnaded loggia. This would have been the summer dining room: for the winter the two eastern cubicula were joined to make a single room.  In the 50s, it seems to have become the house of Lucius Titinius Glaucus Lucretianus, who seems to have been responsible for the repair of the damage caused by an earthquake.  In the garden of the house he added a small sanctuary in the form of a temple to the goddess Diana. Here were found a dedication to the goddess and various fragments of marble furniture and statuary, including a fourth century BCE head of a woman in Greek marble. The house was abandoned no later than the end of the first century CE, and in the third century the space it occupied was used for the construction of a granary.

Houses of Square V-D
The excavations published by R. T. Scott (1993), dealt with a series of small houses in the western part of the site. These occupy street frontages of around 8 metres, with open courtyard spaces and gardens in the rear. The smaller houses strongly resembled the Pompeii-style houses of the time, measuring about 8 meters wide, containing a tablinum-type room and a minimum of one cubiculum, and were grouped around a courtyard.  These smaller houses are typical of Roman housing of the Republican period, bearing a close resemblance to similar structures at Pompeii. The private houses surrounding the forum contrasts the findings of Scott and what was previously thought about the houses at Cosa because they were much bigger and  match the archetypical layout we see at sites like Pompeii. The houses elsewhere in the colony that have been excavated are only half as wide as the large houses surrounding the forum. There are a few possibilities as to what the larger houses meant in the grand scheme of the colony. Archaeologist Vincent Bruno suggests of the unusual layout of the house of the skeleton, a larger, 'atrium' house that this "quality of the unexpected may perhaps be regarded as a symptom of the period in which Roman builders were still experimenting with structural ideas later employed in more rigidly symmetrical compositions". Elizabeth Fentress suggests that the differentiation in house size between the smaller plots in this block and those clustered around the forum is due to a colonist class distinction. The houses near the forum and along the processional streets are almost certainly...houses for two classes of colonists, some of whom received plots twice as large as the others.  The smaller houses are those of the ordinary colonists, with clear parallels at Pompeii and elsewhere. Regardless of the reasoning behind the different sizes and layouts of the private spaces, the houses at Cosa are extremely telling of the history of Cosa after 200 BC. Scott's excavations of the West Block show "not only the effects of the sack and subsequent abandonment of the town in the first century BC, but also those of more recent and seasonal occupation by small farmers and herdsmen between the beginning of the 18th and 19th century."

Ancient port
The ancient port of Cosa is located below the city on the hill to the southeast. It was likely founded at the same time as the early Roman colony in 273 BC, and thus represents the earliest Roman harbor known thus far. The port was initially associated with the Etruscans, however excavations have determined that it was first used by the Romans in the 3rd century BC and continued being used into the 3rd century AD, as confirmed by the material evidence. The Cosa harbor was never a major port of transit, however in ancient times it provided the best anchorage between Gaeta in the south and La Spezia to the north. This was probably a primary reason for the colony's position within newly acquired Etruscan territory. Eventually the harbor established its own community, including a temple dedicated either to Portunus or Neptune, which resembled the Temple on the Arx and probably also dates to 170-160. In addition, remains of fish tanks have been found which suggest the importance of aquiculture and the production of garum. The port's main period of prosperity occurred from the late 2nd century BC through the later 1st century BC, and there was a revival by the 2nd and 3rd centuries AD due to the growth of the villa economy in the countryside of Cosa. Although the city of Cosa and the port must have interacted in important ways, material evidence indicates that they do not follow a parallel development.

Archaeological methods and evidence
The port at Cosa was first surveyed by Professor Frank E. Brown of the American Academy in Rome in 1951. According to Anna Marguerite McCann, one of the later excavators, "in antiquity Cosa was a landlocked port, communicating with the sea by means of an artificial ship-channel, protected at the seaward end by a massive breakwater and provided with a set of elaborate channels cut into the limestone cliff, designed to keep the mouth free of sand." Another lead excavator, Colonel John D. Lewis, invented two new technical devices: a water jet prober to help identify structures buried in the sand, and a construction of sheet steel formed by joining cylinders which could be used to obtain harbor stratification. This allowed finds to be recovered in a stratified context for the first time in underwater archaeology, and established ancient harbor levels for Cosa between one meter and one meter eighty below the current sea floor. Many fragments of transport amphorae have been found on the beach and offshore areas of the harbor, the earliest of which date to the late 3rd century. This provides support for the belief that there was a lucrative wine trade based in the Cosa area, especially because many of the amphorae were stamped with the sign of the Sestius family, major exporters of wine whose trade network extended into Gaul. The earliest Sestius amphorae found at Cosa date to 175-150 and continue into the 1st century. The abundance of Sestius amphorae fragments suggest that the port of Cosa was likely the center of manufacturing and distribution of these famous jars, which firmly places Cosa as a key trading center during the late Republic.

Outer harbor
There are visible remains of five large masonry piers in the outer harbor, which are built from mortared rubblework of tufa and sherds. The sherds are mostly from amphorae of Dressel Type I, suggesting a construction date during the 2nd or 1st centuries BC. The concrete masonry piers provide the earliest evidence for the use of tufo and pozzolana concrete in water, probably dating to the late 2nd or early 1st century BC. Tufo and pozzolana are resistant to deterioration in basic solutions such as salt water, and therefore this type of concrete was used throughout the entire complex in structures that were in constant contact with water. There is also a continuous foundation of stone (only visible underwater) for a breakwater which offered protection on the southern exposure, as well as a series of discontinuous extensions of the breakwater protecting the harbor from the south and southwest winds; "their spacing suggests that they were constructed with the primary purpose of breaking the crushing force of the seas without affecting the flow of currents in and out of the enclosed harbor area."

Fishery
Excavations have uncovered the earliest known commercial fishery about 250 meters behind the port, complete with two long fish tanks and a fresh water spring enclosed in a Spring House (on the western embankment). According to McCann, "connecting channels allowed for a continuing circulation of water and fish as well as salinity and temperature control." The evidence points to a large-scale fishing industry at Cosa, and it is believed that there may have been a factory close by for salting fish and producing the fish sauce garum (trade in garum is thought to have been much more lucrative than most wines).

Significance
McCann points out that "the layer of mud deposited around and on top of the dock as well as the presence of many joining sherds suggests the possibility of destruction by a sudden disaster, such as a tsunami which swept into the inner lagoon." Today the port of Cosa is deserted and the inner lagoon is silted up; however this once-flourishing port provides valuable insights about Roman harbor construction and trade. It forms an important link between the natural breakwaters on the Greek and Etruscan ports and the elaborate engineering of man-made harbors of the Roman Empire (such as the Trajanic port at Ostia). The city was likely founded in order to provide a strategically defendable port "close to the sources of timber and supplies from the Tuscan hinterland which would be necessary in the creation of the fleets Rome soon was to need in her first struggles for maritime supremacy with Carthage." The port of Cosa provides us with the earliest Roman harbor known thus far, the earliest commercial fishery, the earliest evidence for the use of tufo and pozzolana concrete in water, and many other revolutionary and innovative practices, as well as imparting key insights, through the material evidence at the fishery and the Sestius amphorae, about the trade of fish, garum, and wine in the ancient world.

Cosa under the Empire
Cosa appears to have been affected by an earthquake in 51, which occasioned the reconstruction of the republican Basilica as an Odeon under the supervision of Lucius Titinius Glaucus Lucretianus, who also worked on the Capitoline temple; however, as early as 80, Cosa seems to have been almost deserted. It was revived under the emperor Caracalla, during whose reign was built the portico around the forum, concealing two large granaries, while the odeon were restored, a Mithraeum was constructed in the basement of the Curia,  and a sanctuary to Liber erected at the southeast end of the Forum. The new town did not last long, however, and by the 4th century only the sanctuary of Liber was periodically visited. In the early 6th century some occupation in the ruins is attested by pottery and the remains of a church have been found built onto the Basilica. Perhaps at the same time the Arx was occupied by a fortified farm, subsequently transformed into a small fortified outpost under Byzantine control. This was abandoned in the late 6th or early 7th century. It is possible that the intermittent nature of the occupation of the town was due to the fact that, already in the early Empire, malaria was hyperendemic on the coast of Tuscany.

Middle Ages
Cosa appears in some documents dating from the 11th century, although a 9th-century occupation is suggested by frescoes at the abbey of S. Anastasio alle Tre Fontane in Rome, recording the capture of the site by Charlemagne and Pope Leo III. However, no sign of occupation between the eighth and the tenth century has been recovered. By the end of the 10th century, a small cemetery was found next to a church built over a temple facing the forum. The town is recorded as Ansedoniam civitatem in a privilege of Pope Gregory VII (1073-1085).

Occupation of the site began with a few sunken-floored buildings, but by the 11th century it was concentrated on the Eastern Height, now surrounded by a double bank and ditch. In the 12th century, a tower was built in the centre of these fortifications, with a large cistern on two sides. That this cistern was subsequently used as a prison is suggested by graffiti on its plaster lining, one of which gives the date of 1211.

The castle, belonging to the Aldobrandeschi family in 1269, was destroyed by the Sienese army in 1329, on the pretext that it was occupied by bandits. A catapult or trebuchet base found on the Eastern Height may have formed part of the defences at this time. The site remained deserted after this time.

Settefinestre
A large villa complex in the Ager Cosanus at Settefinestre was excavated by Andrea Carandini in the 1970s.

See also
For the "Port of Cosa", Amphora Industry, see Fish sauce, and garum.
See Pozzolana mortar, for the marine concrete in the Port of Cosa.

References

Bibliography
FINAL PUBLICATIONS

Brown, F.E., Richardson E. H. and Richardson, L. jr. "Cosa I, History and Topography." MAAR 20, 1951, 5-113. JSTOR; DOI: 10.2307/4238626
Brown, F.E. Cosa II, the Temples of the Arx. MAAR 26, 1960. JSTOR; DOI: 10.2307/4238649
Dyson, Stephen L. Cosa: The Utilitarian Pottery MAAR 33, 1976. Full text at Hathi Trust.
Brown, F. E. Cosa, the Making of a Roman Town Ann Arbor: University of Michigan Press, 1980. WorldCat
Brown, F.E., Richardson E. H. and Richardson, L. jr. Cosa III: the buildings of the forum: colony, municipium, and village. MAAR 37, Rome 1993. WorldCat
Bruno, V. J. and Scott., R. T. Cosa IV, The Houses. MAAR 38, Rome 1993.
Collins Clinton, J. A Late Antique Shrine of Liber Pater at Cosa, (Etudes préliminaires aux religions orientales dans l'empire romain, vol 64), Leiden, 1977.
McCann, A. M., J. Bourgeois, E.K. Gazda, J.P. Oleson, and E.L. Will. The Roman Port and Fishery of Cosa: a Center of Ancient Trade, Princeton: Princeton University Press, 1987.
Fentress, E. et al. Cosa V: An Intermittent Town, Excavations 1991-1997 MAAR supp. Ann Arbor: University of Michigan Press, 2004. JSTOR; DOI: 10.2307/4238459

MATERIALS
Brendel, O. "A Ganymede Group from Cosa," American Journal of Archaeology 73, 1969, 232.
Buttrey, T.V. "Cosa: The Coins" MAAR 34, 1980, 11-153. JSTOR; DOI: 10.2307/4238673
Fitch, C.R. and Goldman, N., The Lamps, (Memoirs of the American Academy in Rome; 39). University Park: American Academy in Rome, 1993. .
Grose, David Frederick (R. T. Scott, editor). The Hellenistic, Roman, and Medieval Glass from Cosa. (Supplements to the Memoirs of the American Academy in Rome). Ann Arbor: University of Michigan Press, 2017. .
Hobart, M.: 'Ceramica invetriata di Cosa (Ansedonia - Orbetello)' in L. Paroli, ed., La ceramica invetriata tardoantica e altomedievale in Italia, Florence, 1990, 304-309.
Hobart, M. 'La Maiolica arcaica di Cosa (Orbetello)' in Atti del XXIV convegno interna-zionale della ceramica, Albissola, 1991, 71-89.
Marabini Moevs, M. T. The Roman Thin Walled Pottery from Cosa (1948-1954), MAAR 32, 1973. Full text at Hathi Trust.
Marabini Moevs, M. T. "Italo-Megarian Ware at Cosa," MAAR 34, 1980, 161-227. JSTOR; OI: 10.2307/4238674
Marabini Moevs, M. T. Cosa. The Italian Sigillata. MAAR supp. 3. Ann Arbor: Published for the American Academy in Rome by the University of Michigan Press, 2006. WorldCat
Scott, A. R. Cosa: The Black-Glaze Pottery 2. MAAR supp. 5. Ann Arbor: Published for the American Academy in Rome by the University of Michigan Press, 2008. WorldCat
Scott, R. T. "A New Inscription of the Emperor Maximinus at Cosa" Chiron 11, 1981, 309-314.
Scott, R. T. "A new fragment of "serpent ware" from Cosa," JGS 34(1992) 158-159.
Taylor, D. M. "Cosa, Black-Glaze Pottery," MAAR 25, 1957, 65-193.
Tondo, L. "Monete medievale da Ansedonia," ArchMed IV, 1977, 300-305.
Tongue, W. "The Brick Stamps of Cosa," AJA 54, 1950, 263.
Will, E. Lyding "Ambiguity in Horace, Odes 1.4," CP 77 (1982), 240-245.
Will, E. Lyding. "Defining the "Regna Vini" of the Sestii," in Goldman, N.W., ed. New Light from Ancient Cosa: Studies in honor of Cleo Rickman Fitch. New York, 2000, 35-47.
Will, E. Lyding "The Roman Amphoras," in McCann, A.M., J. Bourgeois, E.K. Gazda, J.P. Oleson, and E.L. Will, The Roman Port and Fishery of Cosa: A center of Ancient Trade, Princeton, 1987, 170-220.
Will, E. Lyding "The Sestius Amphoras. A Reappraisal," JFA 6, 1979, 339-350
Will, Elizabeth Lyding and Kathleen Warner Slane. 2019 Cosa: The Roman and Greek Amphoras. (Supplements to the Memoirs of the American Academy in Rome). Ann Arbor: University of Michigan Press. .

EPIGRAPHY
Babcock, Charles L. "An inscription of Trajan Decius at Cosa," AJP 83.2, 1962, 147-158. JSTOR; DOI: 10.2307/292212
Manacorda, D. "Considerazioni sull'epigrafia della regione di Cosa," Athenaeum 57, 1979, 73-92
Saladino, V. "Iscrizioni del territorio di Cosa," Epigraphica 39, 1977, 142-151.
Scott, R. T. "A New Inscription of the Emperor Maximinus at Cosa," Chiron 11, 1981, 309-314.

STUDIES
Brown, F.E., Zancani Montuoro, P. "Il faro di Cosa in ex-voto a Vulci?," RIA 2, 1979, 5-29.
Dyson, S., 2005:  "Success and failures at Cosa (Roman and American)", Journal of Roman Archaeology 18, 615-620. DOI
Fentress, E., Richardson Jr. L., Scott, R.: "Excavations at Cosa: the First Fifty Years"
Fentress, E.,  "Introduction: Cosa and the idea of the city" in Fentress, E., ed., Romanization and the City. Creation, Transformations and Failures, Journal of Roman Archaeology supp. 38, Portsmouth, RI, 2000.
Fentress, E. and Cirelli, E. "After the Rats: Cosa in the Late Empire and Early Middle Ages". In N. Christie and A. Augenti, eds., Urbes Extinctae: archaeologies of abandoned classical towns. Farnham: Ashgate, 2012.
Gerkan, A. von "Zur Datierung der Kolonie Cosa," in Scritti in Onore di Guido Libertini, Florence 1958, 149-156.
Hesberg, H. von. "Coloniae Maritimae," Römische Mitteilungen 92, 1985, 127-150.
Manacorda, D. "The Ager Cosanus and the production of the amphorae of Sestius: New evidence and a reassessment," Journal of Roman Studies 68, 1978, 122-131.
Richardson Jr., L. "Cosa and Rome, Comitium and Curia," Archaeology 10, 1957, 49-55.
Scott, R. T. "The decorations in terracotta from the temples of Cosa," In La coroplastica templare etrusca fra il IV e il II secolo a. C. Florence, 1992, 91-128.
Scott, R. T. "The Latin colony of Cosa," DialArch 6, 1988, 73-77.
Sewell, J., "Trading places? A reappraisal of the fora at Cosa," Ostraka 14, 2005, 91-114.
 Taylor, Rabun. "Temples and Terracottas at Cosa," American Journal of Archaeology 106.1 (2002) 59-84.
Dyson, Stephen L. "Success and failures at Cosa (Roman and American)." Journal of Roman Archaeology 18 (2005) 615-20.
Dyson, Stephen L. "Cosa." In A Companion to the Archaeology of the Roman Republic, edited by J. DeRose Evans, 472-484. Oxford: Blackwell Publishing Ltd, 2013. doi: 10.1002/9781118557129.ch30

INTERIM REPORTS
Brown, F. E. "Scavi a Cosa - Ansedonia 1965-6," BdA 52, 1967, 37-41
Brown, F. E. "The Northwest Gate of Cosa and its Environs," Studi di antichità in onore de G. Maetzke, Rome 1984, 493-498
Ciampoltrini, G. "Orbetello (Grosseto) Località Ansedonia. Ricerche sui monumenti d'età traianea e adreanea del suburbio orientale di Cosa," BA 11-12 1991
Ciampoltrini, G. "Orbetello (Grosseto) La necropoli di Cosa. Ricerche e recuperi 1985-1991," BA 7, 1991, 59-73.
Fentress, E., Hobart, M., Clay, T., Webb, M. "Late Roman and Medieval Cosa I: The Arx and the Structure near the Eastern Height," PBSR 59, 1991, 197-230.
Fentress, E. "Cosa in the empire: the unmaking of a Roman town," Journal of Roman Archaeology 7, 1994, 208-222.
Fentress, E., and Celuzza, M.G. "La Toscana centro-meridionale: i casi di Cosa - Ansedonia e Roselle." In R. Francovich and G.Noyé eds., La Storia dell'Alto Medioevo Florence 1994, 601-613
Fentress, E., and Rabinowitz, A. "Excavations at Cosa 1995: Atrium Building V and a new Republican Temple," MAAR 41, 1996.
Hobart, M. "Cosa - Ansedonia (Orbetello) in età medievale: da una città romana ad un insediamento medievale sparso," ArchMed 22, 1995, 569-583.
Roca Roumens, M.,"Orbetello (GR) . Excavación en la insula O-P/4-5 de ciudad romana de Cosa," Notiziario della Soprintendenza per i Beni archeologici della Toscana 3,2007, 480-485.
Scott, R. "The Arx of Cosa (1965-1970)," AJA 73, 1969, 245

THE TERRITORY OF COSA AND THE LOWER ALBEGNA VALLEY IN THE ROMAN PERIOD
Attolini, I. et al. "Political geography and productive geography between the valleys of the Albegna and the Fiora in northern Etruria," In G. Barker and J. Lloyd, eds, Roman Landscapes, London, 142-153.
Bisconti, F. "Tarda antichità ed alto medioevo nel territorio orbetellano. Primo bilancio critico," Atti del VI congresso nazionale di archeologia cristiana, Florence 1986, 63-77.
Bronson, R., Uggieri, G. "Isola del Giglio, Isola di Giannutri, Monte Argentario, Laguna di Orbetello," SE 38, 1970, 201-230.
Calastri, C. "L’insediamento di Portus Fenilie nell’agro Cosano." Campagna e paesaggio nell’Italia antica, Rome, 2000, 127-136
Cambi, F., Fentress, E. "Villas to Castles: first millennium A.D. Demography in the Albegna Valley." In K. Randsborg, ed., The Birth of Europe, Rome, 1989, 74-86.
Carandini, A. "Il vigneto e la villa del fondo di Settefinestre nel Cosano. Un caso di produzione per il mercato trasmarino," MAAR 36, 1980, 1-10.
Carandini, A. ed. La romanizzazione dell'Etruria: il territorio di Vulci (catalogue of the exhibition at Orbetello, 1985), Florence 1985
Carandini, A., Ricci, A. eds. Settefinestre: una villa schiavistica nell'Etruria romana, Modena 1985.
Carandini, A., Settis, S. eds. Schiavi e padroni nell'Etruria romana Bari 1979
Carandini, A., Cambi, F., Celuzza M.G. and Fentress, E., eds. Paesaggi d'Etruria: Valle dell'Albegna, Valle d'Oro, Valle del Chiarone, Valle del Tafone : progetto di ricerca italo-britannico seguito allo scavo di Settefinestre Roma : Edizioni di storia e letteratura, 2002.
Carlsen, J. "Considerations on Cosa and the Ager Cosanus," AnalRom 13, 1984, 49-58.
Castagnoli, F. "La centuriazione di Cosa," MAAR 25, 1957, 149-165.
Celuzza, M.G., Regoli, E. "La Valle d'Oro nel territorio di Cosa. Ager Cosanus and Ager Veientanus a confronto," DdA 1, 31-62.
Ciampoltrini, G. "Un insediamento tardo-repubblicano ad Albinia," Rassegna di Archeologia 4 1984, 149-180.
Ciampoltrini, G. "Una statua ritratto di età imperiale dalla foce dell'Albegna," Prospettiva 43, 1985, 43-47.
Ciampoltrini, G., Rendini, P. "L'agro Cosano fra tarda antichità e alto medioevo. Segnalazione e contributi," ArchMed 15, 1988, 519-534.
Del Chiaro, M. "A new late republican-early imperial villa at Campo della Chiesa, Tuscany," Journal of Roman Archaeology 2, 1989, 111-117.
Dyson, S. "Settlement Patterns in the Ager Cosanus. The Wesleyan University Survey," Journal of Field Archaeology 5, 1978, 251-263.
Fentress, E. 1984. "Via Aurelia - Via Aemilia," PBSR 52, 1984, 72-77.
Fentress, E.-	"Peopling the Countryside.: Roman Demography in the Albegna Valley and Jerba" in A. Bowman and A. Wilson, eds., Quantifying the Roman Economy. Methods and Problems.  Oxford, 127-162.
Manacorda, D. "Produzione agricola, produzione ceramica e proprietari nell'ager Cosanus nel I sec. a. C." In Società romana e produzione schiavistica Bari 1981, 3-54.
Pasquinucci, M. 1982. "Contributo allo studio dell 'ager cosanus: la villa dei muraci a Porto Santo Stefano," SCO 32, 1982, 141 -149
Quilici-Gigli, S., Quilici L. "Ville dell'agro cosano con fronte a torrette," RIA 1 1978, 11-64.
Quilici-Gigli, S. "Portus Cosanus. Da monumento archeologico a spiaggia di Ansedonia," BstorArt 36, 1993, 57-63.
Peacock, D.: 1977. "Recent Discoveries of Amphora Kilns in Italy," AntJ 57, 1977, 262ff.
Rathbone, D. "The development of agriculture in the Ager Cosanus during the Roman Republic. Problems of evidence and interpretation," JRS 71 1981, 10-23.
Uggeri, G. "Il popolamento del territorio cosano nell'antichità." In Aspetti e problemi di storia dello Stato dei presidi in Maremma, Grosseto 1981, 37-53.
Vitali, D., Laubenheimer, F., "Albinia, Torre Saline (prov. Di Grosseto) Il complesso produttivo con fornaci, II-I secolo a.C.-I secolo d.C." MEFRA 116, 2004, 591-604.
Vitali, D., Laubenheimer, F., Benquet, L.  "La produzione e il commercio del vino nell’Etruria romana. Le fornaci di Albinia (Orbetello, GR.)" in Archeologia della vite e del vino in Etruria. Atti del Convegno internazionale di studi. Scansano, 9-10 settembre 2005, Siena 2007. 191-200.
Vitali, D., ed, 2007. Le fornaci e le anfore di Albinia: primi dati su produzioni e scambi dalla costa tirrenica al mondo gallico. Atti del seminario internazionale (Ravenna, 6-7 maggio 2006). Albinia, 1.

External links

 
 
 
 American Mineralogist, 2017
 

Roman sites of Tuscany
Former populated places in Italy
Archaeological sites in Tuscany
Roman towns and cities in Italy
Roman Republic
Polygonal masonry
Coloniae (Roman)
Roman citadels in Italy
National museums of Italy
Capitoline Triad